Abdullah Al-Misaiki (Arabic:عبد الله المسيكي; born 1 January 1995) is a Qatari footballer. He currently plays as a defender for Umm Salal.

Career

Al-Sadd
Al-Misaiki started his career at Al-Sadd and is a product of the Aspire Academy's youth system.

El-Jaish
In the 2015-2016 season, he left Al-Sadd and signed with El Jaish on loan of the season.

Al-Arabi
In the 2017-2018 season, he left Al-Sadd and signed with Al-Arabi. On 19 January 2018, Al-Misaiki made his professional debut for Al-Arabi against Al-Duhail in the Pro League.

Al-Shahania
On 23 July 2018, he left Al-Arabi and signed with Al-Shahania. On 8 November 2018, Al-Misaiki made his professional debut for Al-Shahania against Al-Duhail in the Pro League.

External links

References

1995 births
Living people
Qatari footballers
Al Sadd SC players
Aspire Academy (Qatar) players
El Jaish SC players
Al-Arabi SC (Qatar) players
Al-Shahania SC players
Umm Salal SC players
Qatar Stars League players
Qatari Second Division players
Association football defenders
Place of birth missing (living people)